The 2006–07 FA Premier League (known as the FA Barclays Premiership for sponsorship reasons) was the 15th season of the FA Premier League since its establishment in 1992. The season started on 19 August 2006 and concluded on 13 May 2007. On 12 February 2007, the FA Premier League renamed itself simply the Premier League, complete with new logo, sleeve patches and typeface. The sponsored name remains the Barclays Premier League.

Manchester United ended the season as Premiership champions for the ninth time in fifteen years, after Chelsea failed to win against Arsenal at the Emirates Stadium on 6 May 2007. This left them seven points behind United, with two games to go, confirming the Manchester club as champions once more.

The three relegation spots were occupied by Watford and Sheffield United who each lasted one season in the league, along with Charlton Athletic who went down after seven seasons.

Teams
Twenty teams competed in the league – the top seventeen teams from the previous season and the three teams promoted from the Championship. The promoted teams were Reading (playing in the top flight for the first time ever), Sheffield United (playing top flight football for the first time in twelve years) and Watford (returning after a six-year absence). They replaced Birmingham City, West Bromwich Albion and Sunderland, ending their top flight spells of four, two and one year respectively.

Stadiums and locations

Personnel and kits
(as of 13 May 2007)

Managerial changes

League table

Results

Season statistics

Scoring
Biggest win: 6 goals – Reading 6–0 West Ham United (1 January 2007)
Highest scoring match: 8 goals – Arsenal 6–2 Blackburn Rovers
First goal: Rob Hulse for Sheffield United against Liverpool (19 August 2006)
Last goal: Harry Kewell (pen.) for Liverpool against Charlton Athletic (13 May 2007)

Overall
Most wins: 28 – Manchester United
Fewest wins: 5 – Watford
Most losses: 21 – West Ham United
Fewest losses: 3 – Chelsea
Most goals scored: 83 – Manchester United
Fewest goals scored: 29 – Manchester City and Watford
Most goals conceded: 60 – Fulham and Charlton Athletic
Fewest goals conceded: 24 – Chelsea

Home
Most wins: 15 – Manchester United
Fewest wins: 3 – Watford
Most losses: 10 – Wigan Athletic
Fewest losses: 0 – Chelsea
Most goals scored: 46 – Manchester United
Fewest goals scored: 10 – Manchester City
Most goals conceded: 30 – Wigan Athletic
Fewest goals conceded: 7 – Liverpool

Away
Most wins: 13 – Manchester United
Fewest wins: 1 – Fulham and Charlton Athletic
Most losses: 14 – Sheffield United
Fewest losses: 3 – Manchester United and Chelsea
Most goals scored: 37 – Manchester United
Fewest goals scored: 8 – Sheffield United
Most goals conceded: 42 – Fulham
Fewest goals conceded: 13 – Chelsea

Statistics

Goals

Historic goals

15,000th goal
The Premier League expected to have the league's 15,000th goal scored at some point in the period between Christmas and New Year. The target was reached on 30 December when Moritz Volz scored for Fulham against Chelsea. Barclays, the Premiership's sponsor, donated £15,000 to the Fulham Community Sports Trust in Volz' name.  Additionally, a fan who correctly predicted that Volz would score the historic goal in a contest presented the player with a special award prior to Fulham's game against Watford at Craven Cottage on 1 January. The honour of scoring the 15,000th goal led to Volz being nicknamed "15,000 Volz".

Goalkeeper scores
On 17 March 2007, Tottenham Hotspur goalkeeper Paul Robinson scored against Watford from an 83-yard free kick, which bounced over his England teammate Ben Foster, who was in goal for the Hornets, leading Spurs to a 3–1 win at White Hart Lane. This was the third goal scored by a goalkeeper in Premiership history. The other two were scored by Peter Schmeichel, for Aston Villa against Everton on 21 October 2001, and Brad Friedel, for Blackburn Rovers against Charlton Athletic on 21 February 2004. In those two cases, the teams they played for lost. Robinson became the first keeper to score for the winning team in a Premiership match.

Relegation controversy
West Ham escaped relegation on the final day of the season with a 1–0 win over Manchester United, with Carlos Tevez scoring the winner. Sheffield United were relegated, along with Charlton and Watford. Tevez was subsequently found to have been ineligible to play, as he was not owned by West Ham, but by a third party. Sheffield United sued to keep their Premier League status and, when that failed, went to an FA arbitration panel seeking up to £30m compensation. The arbitration panel found in favour of Sheffield United. The two clubs subsequently settled out of court for an undisclosed sum.

Monthly awards

Annual awards
This season's awards were dominated by Manchester United, who, as a team, picked up a total of eight individual awards, five of which went to Cristiano Ronaldo. They also had eight players in the Team of the Year.

PFA Players' Player of the Year
The PFA Players' Player of the Year award for 2007 was won by Cristiano Ronaldo. He had won the PFA Young Player of the Year award earlier on in the awards ceremony, making him the first player to win both awards in the same year since Andy Gray managed the same feat in 1977. Didier Drogba came second, while Paul Scholes was third.

The shortlist for the PFA Players' Player of the Year award, in alphabetical order, is as follows:
Didier Drogba (Chelsea)
Cesc Fàbregas (Arsenal)
Steven Gerrard (Liverpool)
Ryan Giggs (Manchester United)
Cristiano Ronaldo (Manchester United)
Paul Scholes (Manchester United)

PFA Young Player of the Year
The PFA Young Player of the Year award was also won by Cristiano Ronaldo of Manchester United. Cesc Fàbregas came in second place, and Aaron Lennon was third. Wayne Rooney was going for a hat-trick of Young Player of the Year awards, having won this award for both of the two preceding seasons, but didn't even feature in the top three for the 2006–07 season.

The shortlist for the award was as follows:
Kevin Doyle (Reading)
Cesc Fàbregas (Arsenal)
Aaron Lennon (Tottenham Hotspur)
Micah Richards (Man City)
Cristiano Ronaldo (Manchester United)
Wayne Rooney (Manchester United)

PFA Team of the Year
Goalkeeper: Edwin van der Sar (Manchester United)
Defence: Gary Neville, Patrice Evra, Rio Ferdinand, Nemanja Vidić (all Manchester United)
Midfield: Steven Gerrard (Liverpool), Paul Scholes, Ryan Giggs, Cristiano Ronaldo (all Manchester United)
Attack: Didier Drogba (Chelsea), Dimitar Berbatov (Tottenham Hotspur)

PFA Merit Award
The PFA Merit Award was awarded to Sir Alex Ferguson, manager of Manchester United, for his commitment to the club, the Premiership, and as recognition of the nineteen major trophies he has won in his time in England.

PFA Fans' Player of the Year
This award was voted for in an online poll run by the PFA on their website. With four days of voting left before the closing date of midnight on 15 April, the five players with the most votes in the poll were Cristiano Ronaldo, Steven Gerrard, Dimitar Berbatov, Thierry Henry and Frank Lampard, but it was Ronaldo who managed to fend off the challenges of the other four.

FWA Footballer of the Year
The FWA Footballer of the Year award for 2007 was also won by Cristiano Ronaldo. The award is presented by the Football Writers' Association and voted for by its members. This year, Didier Drogba came second and Ryan Giggs and Paul Scholes came third and fourth respectively.

Premier League Manager of the Season
The Premier League Manager of the Season award was presented to Manchester United's Sir Alex Ferguson before the club's final game of the season against West Ham United.

Premier League Player of the Season
The Premier League Player of the Season award was also presented before Manchester United's game with West Ham United on the last day of the season, and was awarded to Cristiano Ronaldo, granting him the sextuple of PFA Players' Player, Young Player, Fans' Player of the Year, Barclays Premiership Player of the Season, Football Writers' Association Player of the Year and a place in the Team of the Year.

Premier League Merit Award
Ryan Giggs was presented with this special award at the same time as the Manager and Player of the Season Awards were given out, in recognition of his record of nine Premier League titles.

Premier League Golden Glove
The Premier League Golden Glove award was presented to Liverpool's Pepe Reina for the second successive season after keeping 19 clean sheets, ahead of Tim Howard of Everton (14) and Marcus Hahnemann of Reading (13).

See also
2006–07 in English football
2006–07 Football League

Notes

External links

2006–07 Premier League Season at RSSSF
 Premier League 2006–07 on BBC Sport: News – Recent results  – Upcoming fixtures  – Live Scores – Current standings 
Official Premier League site

 
Premier League seasons
Eng
1